The discography of American jazz singer Julie London consists of 29 studio albums, one live album, six compilation albums, two additional albums, and 29 singles. After a moderately successful film career, London signed a recording contract with the newly formed Liberty Records in 1955. Her debut single "Cry Me a River" reached number nine on the Billboard Hot 100 in 1955. In June 1957, it would also peak at number twenty-two on the UK Singles Chart. "Cry Me a River" became London's most successful and highest-selling single of her musical career. The single would sell three million copies in total. Her debut studio album Julie Is Her Name was issued in December 1955 and reached the second position on the Billboard 200 albums chart. London's next three studio releases, Lonely Girl (1956), Calendar Girl (1956), and About the Blues (1957), reached the top-twenty of the Billboard 200 survey as well.

Although London did not have further success, she continued releasing material. Her 1950s studio albums received attention due to the sexuality of her album covers. This can be seen on the covers of Make Love to Me (1957) and London by Night (1958). In 1959 she recorded two studio albums of Traditional Pop material: Swing Me an Old Song and Your Number Please. In 1960 she recorded a studio album at her home in California entitled Julie...At Home. London's 1961 studio album Whatever Julie Wants featured her naked, wearing a fur coat over her body. Her nineteenth studio record The End of the World (1963) became her first in six years to chart the Billboard 200, reaching the one hundred twenty seventh position. The Wonderful World of Julie London, her twentieth studio release, also reached the Billboard 200 chart. London issued her first live album in 1964 titled In Person at the Americana. In 1965 she released an album of music dedicated to Cole Porter. London continued recording for the Liberty label until 1969. She released her final studio album Yummy, Yummy, Yummy in 1968. The title track also became London's final appearance on a Billboard chart, reaching the twenty fifth position on the Bubbling Under Hot 100 singles chart.

Albums

Studio albums

Extended play

Other albums

Compilation albums

Singles

As lead artist

References

External links 
 Julie London full discography listing at Discogs

Discographies of American artists
Vocal jazz discographies